The Group 4A North Region is a division of the Virginia High School League. The region was formed in 2013 when the VHSL adopted a six classification format and eliminated the previous three classification system. For the purpose of regular season competition, schools may compete within districts that existed prior to 2013. The division is composed of 28 schools separated into four conferences 21A, 21B, 22,23, and 24. This format is mainly for regular season competition and schools are not limited to these classifications.

Conferences for 2017-2018

Conference 21A
Sherando High School of Stephens City, Virginia
Woodgrove High School of Purcellville, Virginia
Millbrook High School of Frederick County, Virginia
James Wood High School of Winchester, Virginia
Harrisonburg High School of Harrisonburg, Virginia
John Handley High School of Winchester, Virginia

Conference 21B
Heritage High School of Leesburg, Virginia
Dominion High School of Sterling, Virginia
Park View High School of Sterling, Virginia
Loudoun County High School of Leesburg, Virginia
Loudoun Valley High School of Purcellville, Virginia
Rock Ridge High School of Ashburn, Virginia

Conference 22
Kettle Run High School of Nokesville, Virginia
Fauquier High School of Fauquier, Virginia
Liberty High School of Bealeton, Virginia
John Champe High School of Aldie, Virginia
Freedom High School of South Riding, Virginia

Conference 23
Charlottesville High School of Charlottesville, Virginia
E. C. Glass High School of Lynchburg, Virginia
Louisa County High School of Mineral, Virginia
Amherst County High School of Amherst, Virginia
Jefferson Forest High School of Bedford County, Virginia
George Washington High school of Danville, Virginia

Conference 24
Pulaski County High School of Dublin, Virginia
Salem High School of Salem, Virginia
Carroll County High School of Hillsville, Virginia
Bassett High School of Bassett, Virginia
William Fleming High School of Roanoke, Virginia
William Byrd High School of Roanoke County, Virginia

External links
 Virginia High School League

References

Virginia High School League
High school sports in Virginia